The Ma On Shan Iron Mine is a mine in the hills of Ma On Shan, Sha Tin District, Hong Kong, that was operated from 1906 to 1976. The nearby Ma On Shan Village accommodated the miners and their families.

History
The Ma On Shan Iron Mine opened in 1906 as an opencast site run by the Hong Kong Iron Mining Co. Ltd., which was owned by Sir Paul Chater. In 1949, the mine was taken over by the Mutual Mining and Trade Company, which extended it underground in 1953. By 1959, mining had moved entirely underground. The mine ceased operation in 1976. The workforce of 400 was laid off. The government mining lease ended in 1981 and the mine closed subsequently.

Mine operators
Historical operators of the mine:
 1906-1929: The Hong Kong Iron Mining Co. Ltd.
 1931-1940: New Territories Iron Company
 1940-1941: South China Iron Smelters Co. Ltd
 1942-1945: (Japanese occupation of Hong Kong)
 1945-1948: Possibly small scale excavation by South China Iron Smelters Co. Ltd
 1949-1976: Mutual Trust Co. Ltd
 1953-1976: Joint venture between Mutual Trust Co. Ltd and Nittetsu Mining Company (Japan)

Present and future
It has been suggested that the Ma On Shan Iron Mine could be repurposed as a storage location for compressed-air energy storage (CAES).

Several sets of structures of the Ma On Shan Iron Mine were listed as historic monuments in April 2016: Exterior walls of 240 ML and 110 ML of Ma On Shan Iron Mine (Grade 2), Mineral Preparation Plant of Ma On Shan Iron Mine (Grade 3), Site Structures at Mining Settlement of Ma On Shan Iron Mine (Grade 3).

See also
 Mining in Hong Kong
 Geology of Hong Kong
 Ma On Shan (peak)
 Ma On Shan Country Park, surrounding the mine area

References

Further reading

External links

 Exterior walls of 240 ML and 110 ML, Ma On Shan Iron Mine: Historic Appraisal Pictures
 Mineral Preparation Plant, Ma On Shan Iron Mine: Historic Appraisal Pictures
 Site Structures at Mining Settlement, Ma On Shan Iron Mine: Historic Appraisal Pictures
 Industrial History of Hong Kong entries:   
 Information from The Evangelical Lutheran Church of Hong Kong: 
 Gwulo.com entry: 
 Zolimag entry: 
 Pictures:   

Iron mines in China
Ma On Shan